Nadia Ginetti (born 25 February 1969) is an Italian politician. She is a senator from Italia Viva.

References 

Living people
1969 births
21st-century Italian women politicians
Senators of Legislature XVII of Italy
Senators of Legislature XVIII of Italy
Women mayors of places in Italy
Democratic Party (Italy) politicians
20th-century Italian women
Women members of the Senate of the Republic (Italy)